The Women Around Larsson (Swedish: Kvinnorna kring Larsson) is a 1934 Swedish drama film directed by Schamyl Bauman and starring Edvard Persson, Gideon Wahlberg and Katie Rolfsen. It was shot at the Sundbyberg Studios of Europa Film in Stockholm. The film's art direction was by Bibi Lindström.

Synopsis
A blacksmith rescues a young sailor who has been beaten up in the street and takes him home and gives him a job as his apprentice. The young man later turns out to be an aristocrat who has run away from home.

Cast
 Edvard Persson as Lasse Larsson  
 Gideon Wahlberg as Johan Jansson  
 Katie Rolfsen as Sara Larsson 
 Dagmar Ebbesen as Mia Sohlström  
 Nils Lundell as Dahlgren  
 Birgit Rosengren as Birgit Jansson  
 Sture Lagerwall as Arne Lindberg  
 Nils Wahlbom as Müller  
 Hugo Björne as Cavalry captain Ahrenskiöld 
 Alice Carlsson as Eva Ahrenskiöld  
 Holger Löwenadler as Detective 
 Jullan Jonsson as Ahrenskiöld's Maid

References

Bibliography
 Larsson, Mariah & Marklund, Anders. Swedish Film: An Introduction and Reader. Nordic Academic Press, 2010.

External links

1934 films
Swedish drama films
Swedish black-and-white films
1934 drama films
1930s Swedish-language films
Films directed by Schamyl Bauman
1930s Swedish films